The Paint Hills Islands are located in James Bay, a part of the Qikiqtaaluk Region, in the Canadian territory of Nunavut. They are southwest of Wemindji, Quebec (Cree for "red ochre mountain"), a Cree community on Paint Hills Bay, and northeast of Solomons Temple Islands.

In 1950, Thomas Henry Manning studied high tide and driftwood strand lines on Paint Hills Islands.

References 

Uninhabited islands of Qikiqtaaluk Region
Islands of James Bay